Marquis of Villahermosa e Santa Croce (in English: Marquis of Fine-Village and Saint Cross) is a title first granted in 1745 by Charles Emmanuel III, king of Sardinia to the Sardinian merchant Bernardino Antonio Genovès. It has passed afterwards to a branch of the house Manca, called Manca di Villahermosa since.

The grant 
Don Bernardino Antonio Genovès belonged to a merchant family that was rapidly growing in the nobility thanks to the strong support to the crown, especially financial and political. His father Antonio Francisco had become Marquis of the Guard in 1699 and himself got the prominent title of Duke of San Pietro in 1737, thus becoming the most relevant Sardinian subject. In 1745 he proposed to populate the mountains (saltos) of Pompongia, Curcuris, Fenugheda, Isola Maggiore e Fossadus by Oristano in exchange with the title of Marquis of Villahermosa e Santa Croce, being Villahermosa the name of the village to build and populate and Santa Croce (Saint Cross) the church to dedicate.

Therefore, it consisted in an unpopulated fief.

The renewal 
The Duke never succeeded to populate the fief and the village and the church were never built. Upon his death, the treasury took the fief over for debts, but his son managed to obtain a new grant to a nephew, Stefano Manca di Thiesi, a Marquis of Morès's cadet grandson and a cousin of the Duke of Asinara. Technically, the act of grace by which the king makes an extinct title live again is called a renewal.

The title has been inherited by male line since and Stefano Manca and his descent have taken the family name Manca di Villahermosa.

List of Marquesses

First grant 
 Bernardino Antonio Genovès, 1st Marquess of Villahermosa e Santa Croce (born 1693), 1745-1764

Renewal 
 Stefano Manca, 2nd Marquess of Villahermosa e Santa Croce (b. 1767), 1804-1838
 Carlo Manca, 3rd Marquess of Villahermosa e Santa Croce (b. 1806), son of the latter, 1838-1864
 Giovanni Manca, 4th Marquess of Villahermosa e Santa Croce, 1st Marquis of Nissa (b. 1808), brother of the latter, 1864-1878
 Stefano Manca, 5th Marquess of Villahermosa e Santa Croce, etc. (b. 1836), son of the latter, 1878-1911
 Giovanni Manca, 6th Marquess of Villahermosa e Santa Croce, etc. (b. 1862), son of the latter, 1911-1918
 Stefano Manca, 7th Marquess of Villahermosa e Santa Croce, etc. (b. 1902), son of the latter, 1918-1946
Present holder is the eldest son of the latter, called Giovanni, with his only son as heir apparent.

References

Sources

See also 
 List of Marquesses in Italy

Titles